The FC Basel 1898–99 season was their sixth season since the club's foundation on 15 November 1893. This was the first season in which they competed for the Swiss championship. The club's chairman was Charlie Volderauer, who was chairman between 1896 and 1900. He was the third chairman in the club's history, following Roland Geldner (1893–1896) and Emanuel Schiess (1896). FC Basel played their home games in the Landhof, in the Quarter Kleinbasel.

Overview 
In the early years of the Basel first team the club did not have a trainer or coach. The work of leading the team trainings and the responsibility of choosing the player line-ups was done by the team captain. Hermann Schneider was appointed as team captain for this season by the club's board of directors under club chairman Charlie Volderauer. The team played four friendly matches in the first half of the season and three after the new year. Three of the games were played at home and four were played away. Four of the friendlies ended with a victory and three ended with a defeat. The team scored 11 goals in these friendlies, but conceded 23.

Although the first national championship in Switzerland took place in 1897–98 it is considered as unofficial because it was not organized by the Swiss Football Association (SFA; founded in 1895). FC Basel did not participate in the first unofficial championship, but did in the first official edition during this season 1898–99.  The club did not compete in the following season either, but have participated in every season since 1900–01.

The 1898–99 championship was played as a knock out competition, divided into three regional groups, an east (region Zürich), a central (regional north-west Switzerland) and west group (Romandy). The winners of each group played the finals in a round-robin tournament. Basel played in the central group against Old Boys. Because the game was drawn, one goal each, it required a replay. This was also drawn, despite an agreed two times 20 minutes extra time. Because the Old Boys then complained that the first FCB goal had been scored by hand they protested and the SFA had to deal with the matter. Subsequently, the protest was approved and awarded - and the disputed goal was simply deducted from the score to give the final result. Thus the Old Boys became the first forfait winners in Swiss football history. The Old Boys advanced to the finals, but the Anglo-American Club Zürich became Swiss champions.

A curiosity in this season was the game in Zürich on 5 March 1899. The majority of them English students, had formed a club and the members of the Anglo-American Club even attended the founder meeting of the Swiss Football Association (ASF-SFV) in April 1895. They had found a place to play their games, although the Zurich commons was by no means ideal. It was often that the players found the grounds very sludgy or with freshly raised molehills. But at least, it was a homestead that was soon called "Anglo-Platz". Suddenly the announcement: "By decree of the military directorate of the canton of Zurich it is forbidden until further notice to play on the military training area Allmend". In the age of mobile communications, a short-term postponement may not attract much attention. But at the end of the 19th century constant accessibility wasn't even wishful thinking. The following could be read about the game against FC Basel which was brought forward from the afternoon to the morning: "As a result, the Anglos, who were only partially able to notify their people, started the game with only seven men. Only during the course of the game was the team completed to the full eleven. There were also replacements in Basel's team, because some players did not arrive until a later train. The appointed referee was not there because he been scheduled for the afternoon. The crowd consisted of approximately 10 to 20 spectators. Under such circumstances, such an important match should not have been played." Despite all the obstacles: The game became a demonstration of the superiority of the British players from Zurich. The Anglo American Football Club won the match 10–0, with their center forward Robert Collinson alone scoring 8 goals. By then, at the latest, it was clear that the Anglos would be unstoppable on their way to the title.

Players

Results

Legend

Friendly matches

Serie A

Central group 

NB: Old Boys win 2–1 after protesting to the SFA. The first goal FCB goal was struck out of the result.

See also
 History of FC Basel
 List of FC Basel players
 List of FC Basel seasons

Notes

Footnotes

References

Sources 
 Rotblau: Jahrbuch Saison 2014/2015. Publisher: FC Basel Marketing AG. 
 Die ersten 125 Jahre. Publisher: Josef Zindel im Friedrich Reinhardt Verlag, Basel. 
 Switzerland 1898-99 at RSSSF
(NB: Despite all efforts, the editors of these books and the authors in "Basler Fussballarchiv" have failed to be able to identify all the players, their date and place of birth or date and place of death, who played in the games during the early years of FC Basel.)

External links
 FC Basel official site

FC Basel seasons
Basel